Anthony Veiller (23 June 1903 – 27 June 1965) was an American screenwriter and film producer. He wrote for 41 films between 1934 and 1964.

Life and career
Veiller was born on 23 June 1903 in New York City to playwright and screenwriter Bayard Veiller and English-born actress Margaret Wycherly. He moved to Hollywood in 1930.

Veiller was twice nominated for an Academy Award for Best Screenplay. In 1937, he co-wrote (with Morrie Ryskind) the screenplay for Stage Door, starring Katharine Hepburn, Ginger Rogers and Adolphe Menjou. This very loose adaptation of the play by George S. Kaufman and Edna Ferber was also nominated for the Academy Award for Best Picture.

Veiller was also Oscar-nominated for writing (with uncredited help from John Huston and Richard Brooks) The Killers (1946), an adaptation of the short story by Ernest Hemingway. The film introduced Burt Lancaster to filmgoers, and won an Edgar Award as best mystery film of 1946. In 2008, it was included in the United States National Film Registry by the Library of Congress.

During the Second World War he worked with Frank Capra on several films in the documentary/propaganda film series collectively titled Why We Fight. In 1946 (the same year as The Killers), Veiller co-wrote The Stranger, directed by and starring Orson Welles. For State of the Union (1948), again directed by Capra, Veiller was credited as co-producer as well as co-writer. Veiller worked with director John Huston on several films: Moulin Rouge (1952), Beat the Devil (1953), The List of Adrian Messenger (1963), and The Night of the Iguana (1964), the film of the Tennessee Williams play that became Veiller's final screen credit.

Veiller died on 27, June 1965 of cancer in Hollywood, California, four days after his 62nd birthday. He was buried in the St Mary Churchyard, Bepton, Chichester, West Sussex, England as was his mother.

Filmography

 The Witching Hour (1934) - screenplay, producer
 Menace (1934) - screenplay
 The Notorious Sophie Lang (1934) - screenplay
 Break of Hearts (1935) - screenplay
 Star of Midnight (1935) - screenplay
College Scandal (1935) - uncredited writer
 Jalna (1935) - screenplay
 Seven Keys to Baldpate (1935) - screenplay
 The Lady Consents (1936) - screenplay
 The Ex-Mrs. Bradford (1936) - screenplay
 Swing Time (1936) - uncredited writer
 A Woman Rebels (1936) - screenplay
 Winterset (1936) - screenplay
 The Soldier and the Lady (1937) - screenplay
 Stage Door (1937) - screenplay
 Radio City Revels (1938) - screenplay
The Saint in New York (1938) - screenplay
 Gunga Din (1939) - uncredited writer
 Let Us Live (1939) - screenplay
 Disputed Passage (1939) - screenplay
 Typhoon (1940) - producer
Safari (1940) - producer
The Quarterback (1940) - producer
Moon Over Burma (1940) - producer
Victory (1940) - producer
New York Town (1941) - producer
 Her Cardboard Lover (1942) - screenplay
 Why We Fight: Prelude to War (1942) (documentary) - uncredited writer
 Why We Fight: The Battle of Russia (1943) (documentary) - uncredited writer, narrator
 Why We Fight: The Nazis Strike (1943) (documentary) - uncredited writer, narrator
 Why We Fight: The Battle of Britain (1943) (documentary) - uncredited director, narrator
 Assignment in Brittany (1943) - screenplay
Know Your Ally: Britain (1944) (documentary) - uncredited director
 Tunisian Victory (documentary) (1944) - uncredited writer
 Adventure (1945) - screenplay
 War Comes to America (1945) (documentary) - uncredited writer
 Two Down and One to Go (1945) (documentary) - screenplay
 Here is Germany (1945) (documentary) - uncredited writer, narrator
 The Stranger (1946) - screenplay
 The Killers (1946) - screenplay
 State of the Union (1948) - screenplay, associate producer
Colorado Territory (1949) - producer
Backfire (1950) - producer
Chain Lightning (1950) - producer
Dallas (1950) - producer
Along the Great Divide (1951) - producer
Fort Worth (1951) - producer
Force of Arms (1951) - producer
Red Planet Mars (1952) - screenplay, producer
 Moulin Rouge (1952) - screenplay
 Beat the Devil (1953) - uncredited writer
 That Lady (1955) - screenplay
 Safari (1956) - screenplay
 Monkey on My Back (1957) - screenplay
The Adventures of Tugboat Annie (1958) (TV series) - executive producer
 Solomon and Sheba (1959) - screenplay
 Timbuktu (1959) - screenplay
Markham (1960) (TV series) writer of episodes
 The List of Adrian Messenger (1963) - screenplay
 The Night of the Iguana (1964) - screenplay

References

External links
 

American male screenwriters
1903 births
1965 deaths
20th-century American male writers
20th-century American screenwriters